McEvoy (or  or alternatively ) is an Irish surname. It is closely related to the name McAvoy and with the placename Clandeboye, an anglicised version of Clann Fhiodhbhuidge. The name translates as either "son of the fair-haired lad" or "son of the woodsman", depending on the original Gaelic version referred to.

Notable people with the surname include:

Ambrose McEvoy (1878–1927), English artist
 Andy McEvoy (1938–1994), Irish footballer
 Anne Marie McEvoy, American actor
 Barry McEvoy, Irish actor
 Ben McEvoy (born 1989), Australian rules footballer
 Brian McEvoy (born 1974), Irish hurler
 Cameron McEvoy (Born 1994), Triple Australian Olympic swimmer
 Charles McEvoy (1879–1929), British playwright
 Christopher McEvoy (1899–1953), English flying ace
 Don McEvoy (1928–2004), English footballer and manager
 Dorothy McEvoy (1910–1994), English cricketer
 Eleanor McEvoy (born 1967), Irish singer-songwriter
 Eugenie McEvoy (1879–1975), American artist
 Frederick McEvoy (1907–1951), Australian/British sportsman
 Harry McEvoy (1902–1984), British industrialist
 J. P. McEvoy (1897–1958), American comics writer
 Jaimie McEvoy (born 1965), Canadian writer and activist
 James McEvoy (teacher) (1930–2007), English educationist
 James McEvoy (philosopher) (1943–2010), Irish philosopher
 Johnny McEvoy (born 1945), Irish singer
 Jonathan McEvoy (born 1989), English cyclist
 Kenny McEvoy (born 1994), Irish professional footballer
 Kerrin McEvoy, (born 1980), Australian jockey
 Lou McEvoy (1902–1953), American baseball player
 Mary McEvoy (born 1954), Irish actor
 Michael McEvoy (born 1956), Indian-born English cricketer
 Michael J McEvoy (born 1961), American screen composer
 Niamh McEvoy (Parnells Gaelic footballer)
 Niamh McEvoy (St. Sylvester's Gaelic footballer)
 Peter McEvoy (born 1953), English golfer
 Richard McEvoy (born 1979), English golfer
 Theodore McEvoy (1904–1991), British Royal Air Force air marshal
 Tom McEvoy (born 1944), American poker player and writer

See also 
 McEvoy Motorcycles, British motorcycle manufacturer

References 

Anglicised Irish-language surnames
Surnames of Irish origin